Nosso Lar 2: Os Mensageiros, commonly known as Nosso Lar 2, is an upcoming Brazilian drama film, written and directed by Wagner de Assis, set to be released in 2023. The screenplay was based on the novel The Messengers (1944), psychographed by the spiritist medium Chico Xavier, under the influence of the spirit of André Luiz.

The sequel to the 2010 movie Astral City: A Spiritual Journey, Nosso Lar 2: Os Mensageiros tells the story of a group of workers from Nosso Lar, better known as "The Messengers", who comes to Earth on a rescue mission to assist people who are about to fail in their lives, forgetting the planning they made, and heading their destinies towards great suffering.

The film stars actor Renato Prieto in the role of the main character, André Luiz, and features Edson Celulari, Mouhamed Harfouch, Vanessa Gerbelli, Fernanda Rodrigues, Fábio Lago, Felipe de Carolis, and guest appearance by Othon Bastos.

Plot
André Luiz (Renato Prieto) joins a group of messenger spirits led by Aniceto (Edson Celulari), who sets out for Earth to follow the unfolding of a mission that is in danger of failing: the creation of a spiritual work that connects the two worlds. In the process, they also face their own dramas. Together, they dedicate themselves to taking care of three protégés whose stories are intertwined: Otávio (Felipe de Carolis), a young medium who did not fulfill the plan in his mission; Isidoro (Mouhamed Harfouch), leader of a spiritist house; and Fernando (Rafael Sieg), entrepreneur responsible for financing the project.

Cast
 Renato Prieto .... André Luiz
 Edson Celulari ... Aniceto
 Felipe de Carolis ... Otávio
 Mouhamed Harfouch ... Isidoro
 Rafael Sieg ... Fernando
 Othon Bastos ... Anacleto, Governor of Nosso Lar
 Fábio Lago
 Vanessa Gerbelli
 Fernanda Rodrigues
 Nando Brandão
 Ju Trevisol

Production
On August 7, 2015, the Brazilian Spiritualist Federation (FEB) first announced the sequel to the highly successful film Astral City: A Spiritual Journey (2010), entitled Nosso Lar 2: Os Mensageiros, and that, just like on the first movive, it would be directed by Wagner de Assis. In 2017, the film entered pre-production phase, raising funds for its production. On August 24, 2018, FEB reported that the film was scheduled to be released in early 2019.

On April 18, 2022, it was revealed that actor Edson Celulari would join the production, and the cast met in Rio de Janeiro for a workshop on Spiritism, the Brazilian Spiritist Federation, Chico Xavier, and André Luiz, with focus on the book The Messengers (1944). On the same day, it was announced that filming will begin the following week, in the city of Rio de Janeiro, and that the movie will premiere in 2023.

References

Upcoming films
Brazilian drama films
Portuguese-language films
Films about reincarnation
Films about Spiritism